May is a genus of spiders in the family Sparassidae. It was first described in 2015 by Peter Jäger and Henrik Krehenwinkel.

Species
, the World Spider Catalog accepted the following species, all found in southern Africa:
May ansie Jäger & Krehenwinkel, 2015 – Namibia
May bruno Jäger & Krehenwinkel, 2015 (type species) – South Africa
May norm Jäger & Krehenwinkel, 2015 – Namibia
May rudy Jäger & Krehenwinkel, 2015 – Namibia

References

Sparassidae
Araneomorphae genera
Spiders of Africa